Ernest Boahene (born 6 March 2000) is a Ghanaian professional footballer who plays as a right-back. Currently playing for Eliteserien side Strømsgodset in Norway.

Career
On 26 August 2019, Boahene joined Paris FC from Ghana. He made his professional debut with Paris FC in a 3–0 Ligue 2 loss to Chambly on 2 September 2019.

References

External links
 

2000 births
Living people
Footballers from Accra
Ghanaian footballers
Association football fullbacks
FC Metz players
Paris FC players
Ligue 2 players
Strømsgodset Toppfotball players
Eliteserien players
Ghanaian expatriate footballers
Expatriate footballers in France
Ghanaian expatriate sportspeople in France
Expatriate footballers in Norway
Ghanaian expatriate sportspeople in Norway